The men's 50 metre backstroke competition of the 2018 FINA World Swimming Championships (25 m) was held on 13 and 14 December 2018.

Records
Prior to the competition, the existing world and championship records were as follows.

Results

Heats
The heats were started on 13 December at 9:56.

Semifinals
The semifinals were started on 13 December at 20:22.

Semifinal 1

Semifinal 2

Final
The final was held on 14 December at 20:30.

References

Men's 50 metre backstroke